Jennifer Joy Freyd (born October 16, 1957, in Providence, Rhode Island) is an American researcher, author, educator, and speaker. Freyd is an extensively published scholar who is best known for her theories of betrayal trauma, DARVO, institutional betrayal, and institutional courage.

Freyd is the Founder and President of the Center for Institutional Courage, Professor Emerit of Psychology at the University of Oregon, Adjunct Professor of Psychiatry and Behavioral Sciences in the School of Medicine, Faculty Fellow at the Clayman Institute for Gender Research, Affiliated Faculty, Women's Leadership Lab, Stanford University and principal investigator of the Freyd Dynamics Lab.

Freyd is a Member of the Advisory Committee, 2019–2023, for the Action Collaborative on Preventing Sexual Harassment in Higher Education, National Academies of Science, Engineering, and Medicine. She is a Fellow of the American Psychological Association, the American Psychological Society, and the American Association for the Advancement of Science. Since 2005, Freyd has been the editor of the Journal of Trauma & Dissociation.

She is also the leader of the Program on Interdisciplinary Perspectives on Sexual Violence at the Center for Advanced Study in the Behavioral Sciences at Stanford University.

Education and employer
Freyd attended Friends Select School in Philadelphia and after three years of high school was admitted to the University of Pennsylvania where she received a Bachelor of Arts degree in Anthropology. In 1983 she earned her Ph.D. in Psychology at Stanford University.

Freyd was an assistant professor at Cornell University from 1983 to 1987, until she was hired with tenure as an Associate Professor of Psychology at the University of Oregon in 1987. In 1992, Freyd was promoted to full professor at the University of Oregon.

In 2017, Freyd filed suit against the University of Oregon for violating the Equal Pay Act, the Equal Protection Clause, and Title IX during her decades of employment. Freyd's complaint raises important issues regarding the enforcement of federal equality laws in academia, and the pay gap for women in particular. Dozens of women's and civil rights groups have collaborated on amicus briefs, including Equal Rights Advocates, the ACLU Women's Rights Project, the National Women's Law Center, the American Association of University Professors. The case was heard by the Ninth Circuit Court of Appeals. The Ninth Circuit ruled in favor of Freyd's appeal on March 15, 2021, setting important precedent.

Research and theory
In the last two decades, Freyd has researched and written extensively on sexual abuse and memory. Freyd's initial empirical discovery of representational momentum and shareability led to her further explore the relationship between trauma memories and the element of betrayal. Freyd introduced the following original concepts to the trauma literature: Betrayal Trauma, DARVO, Institutional Betrayal, and Institutional Courage.

Betrayal trauma is defined as a trauma perpetrated by someone whom the victim is close to and reliant upon for support and survival.

DARVO is an acronym used to describe a common strategy of abusers. The abuser may: Deny the abuse ever took place, Attack the victim for attempting to hold the abuser accountable; and claim that they, the abuser, are the real victim in the situation, thus Reversing the Victim and Offender.

Institutional betrayal refers to "wrongdoings perpetrated by an institution upon individuals dependent on that institution, including failure to prevent or respond supportively to wrongdoings by individuals (e.g. sexual assault) committed within the context of the institution". It is an extension of betrayal trauma theory. In a 2013 study, Carly P. Smith and Jennifer Freyd documented the psychological harm caused by institutional betrayal.

Freyd introduced the term institutional courage in 2014.

In a September 2019 article in the Journal of Trauma & Dissociation, Freyd and Smidt emphasize the value of education for organizations that are taking steps toward institutional courage. The authors make a distinction between training (which connotes "compliance and a rules-based process") and education, which "is associated with complex understanding, critical thinking, and the acquisition of knowledge based on empirical research and theory development". As it concerns sexual violence (a primary focus of Freyd's research), education is needed to help society understand "major aspects of the frequency, consequences, and dynamics of sexual harassment and assault".

In early 2019, Freyd announced a new research initiative to promote the study of institutional courage. The project supported interdisciplinary research on the interconnected problems of sexual violence, DARVO, and institutional betrayal, as well as ways in which institutional courage can flourish. Freyd described her current research agenda on institutional betrayal and courage and intention to create a nonprofit organization, The Center for Institutional Courage, on a December 2019 episode of the Human Centered podcast. Freyd described the Center for Institutional Courage as “roughly equal parts a research center that can nurture new knowledge generation, and an outreach part that applies that knowledge to the world”. In early 2020, Freyd and her colleagues incorporated the Center for Institutional Courage 501(c)(3), an institution dedicated to scientific research, wide-reaching education, and data-driven action promoting institutional courage. In 2021, the Center for Institutional Courage funded 15 research projects on the topics of institutional courage, institutional betrayal, and DARVO.

Activism
Because of her research on sexual assault and institutional betrayal, Freyd was invited to the White House in 2014 to meet with White House advisors on violence against women, as well as New York Senator Kirsten Gillibrand, to discuss how her research relates to campus sexual violence. In June 2017, Freyd was invited again to speak at a meeting of the National Academies of Sciences, Engineering, and Medicine, where she presented on institutional betrayal and sexual harassment in academia. In an open essay, entitled "Gender Discrimination, Dr. Jennifer Freyd's Lawsuit, & Recommendations for Universities," the author underscored the far-reaching consequences of gender discrimination against women in higher education.

Freyd's research on sexual violence and institutional betrayal has become increasingly prominent with the rise of the Me Too movement and growing societal awareness of the prevalence of sexual harassment and assault. For example, in an interview with Diane Sawyer in 2017, actress and political activist Ashley Judd referenced DARVO when discussing the Harvey Weinstein sexual abuse allegations.

Freyd has focused on ensuring that survivors do not lose their voice in the process of reporting sexual violence. Freyd asserted that since institutions can perpetrate abuse by (1) ignoring survivors' wishes about how their private information is shared when they decide to disclose, and (2) by emphasizing that survivors' information will be passed along without their consent, she proposed that faculty educate colleagues and students about Title IX, sexual violence, and institutional betrayal, as well as provide resources for disrupting a culture of sexual violence and learning how to be a good listener. Freyd has proposed 10 steps by which institutions (including universities) can make progress toward institutional courage, such as encouraging whistleblowing and carrying out assessments of institutional betrayal through anonymous surveys. The Chronicle of Higher Education has covered the ongoing debate at the University of Oregon and the Association of American Universities (AAU). Dozens of scientists have criticized the AAU's proposed campus climate survey, with Freyd as a key player in the scientific debate.

In 2021, Freyd argued that academic institutions should cease the use of the gendered honorary titles 'emeritus' and 'emerita' and instead adopt the gender-neutral term 'emerit'. As of early 2022, both the University of Oregon and Oregon State University are considering dropping the gendered titles in favor of 'emerit' or a similar gender-neutral alternative.

Personal life
Freyd was married to John Quincy "JQ" Johnson III, from 1984 until his death in 2012. Together they have three children.

Around 1990, Freyd severed ties with her parents, stating that a recent therapy had uncovered memories of her father, mathematics professor Peter J. Freyd, abusing her during her childhood. Her parents, Pamela and Peter Freyd, disputed Freyd's claims of sexual assault, and in 1992 co-founded the False Memory Syndrome Foundation, which has been described as a US "advocacy group [...] for people claiming to have been wrongly accused of physical and sexual abuse." Three years after its founding, it had more than 7,500 members. The foundation was dissolved on December 31, 2019.

Selected publications

Books
 .

Chapters in books

Journal articles
 Pdf.
 Pdf.
 Pdf.
 Pdf.
 Pdf.
 Pdf.
 Pdf.
 Pdf.
 Pdf.

References

1957 births
Living people
University of Oregon faculty
University of Pennsylvania alumni
Stanford University alumni
Cornell University faculty
Fellows of the American Psychological Association